The 150th (Carabiniers Mont Royal) Battalion, CEF was a unit in the Canadian Expeditionary Force during the First World War.  Based in Montreal, Quebec, the unit began recruiting in late 1915 in that city and the surrounding district.  After sailing to England in September 1916, the battalion was absorbed into the 14th, 22nd, 24th, and 87th Battalions, CEF, and the 5th Canadian Mounted Rifles.  The unit officially ceased to exist as of February 15, 1918.  The 150th (Carabiniers Mont Royal) Battalion, CEF had one Officer Commanding: Lieut-Col. Hercule Barre.

References

Meek, John F. Over the Top! The Canadian Infantry in the First World War. Orangeville, Ont.: The Author, 1971.

Battalions of the Canadian Expeditionary Force
Military units and formations established in 1915
Military units and formations disestablished in 1918
1915 establishments in Quebec
Fusiliers Mont-Royal